List of heritage places in Busselton is a list of important places within the City of Busselton as defined by the Western Australian Governments State Heritage Office.

List

References

heritage places in Busselton
Busselton, Western Australia